There are 21 isotopes of sodium (11Na), ranging from  to , and two isomers ( and ).  is the only stable (and the only primordial) isotope. With the exception of those two isotopes, all other isotopes have half-lives under a minute, most under a second.

By measuring the concentration of this isotope, the neutron radiation dosage to the victim can be computed.

 is a positron-emitting isotope with a remarkably long half-life. It is used to create test-objects and point-sources for positron emission tomography.

List of isotopes 

|-
| 
| style="text-align:right" | 11
| style="text-align:right" | 6
| 
|
| p
| 
| (1/2+)
|
|
|-
| 
| style="text-align:right" | 11
| style="text-align:right" | 7
| 
| 
| p=?
| 
| 1−#
| 
| 
|-
| 
| style="text-align:right" | 11
| style="text-align:right" | 8
| 
| > 
| p
| 
| (5/2+)
|
|
|-
| rowspan=2|
| rowspan=2 style="text-align:right" | 11
| rowspan=2 style="text-align:right" | 9
| rowspan=2|
| rowspan=2|
| β+
| 
| rowspan=2|2+
| rowspan=2|
| rowspan=2|
|-
| β+α
| 
|-
| 
| style="text-align:right" | 11
| style="text-align:right" | 10
| 
| 
| β+
| 
| 3/2+
| 
| 
|-
| rowspan=2|
| rowspan=2 style="text-align:right" | 11
| rowspan=2 style="text-align:right" | 11
| rowspan=2|
| rowspan=2|
| β+
| 
| rowspan=2|3+
| rowspan=2|Trace
| rowspan=2|
|-
| ε
| 
|-
| style="text-indent:1em" | 
| colspan="3" style="text-indent:2em" | 
| 
| IT
| 
| 1+
|
|
|-
| style="text-indent:1em" | 
| colspan="3" style="text-indent:2em" | 
| 
| IT
| 
| 0+
|
|
|-
| 
| style="text-align:right" | 11
| style="text-align:right" | 12
| 
| colspan=3 align=center|Stable
| 3/2+
| colspan=2 style="text-align:center"|
|-
| 
| style="text-align:right" | 11
| style="text-align:right" | 13
| 
| 
| β−
| 
| 4+
| Trace
|
|-
| rowspan=2 style="text-indent:1em" | 
| rowspan=2 colspan="3" style="text-indent:2em" | 
| rowspan=2|
| IT
| 
| rowspan=2|1+
| rowspan=2|
| rowspan=2|
|-
| β−
| 
|-
| 
| style="text-align:right" | 11
| style="text-align:right" | 14
| 
| 
| β−
| 
| 5/2+
|
|
|-
| 
| style="text-align:right" | 11
| style="text-align:right" | 15
| 
| 
| β−
| 
| 3+
|
|
|-
| style="text-indent:1em" | 
| colspan="3" style="text-indent:2em" | 
| 
| IT
| 
| 1+
|
|
|-
| rowspan=2|
| rowspan=2 style="text-align:right" | 11
| rowspan=2 style="text-align:right" | 16
| rowspan=2| 
| rowspan=2| 
| β−
| 
| rowspan=2|5/2+
| rowspan=2|
| rowspan=2|
|-
| β−n
| 
|-
| rowspan=2|
| rowspan=2 style="text-align:right" | 11
| rowspan=2 style="text-align:right" | 17
| rowspan=2|
| rowspan=2|
| β−
| 
| rowspan=2|1+
| rowspan=2|
| rowspan=2|
|-
| β−n
| 
|-
| rowspan=3|
| rowspan=3 style="text-align:right" | 11
| rowspan=3 style="text-align:right" | 18
| rowspan=3|
| rowspan=3|
| β−
| 
| rowspan=3|3/2+
| rowspan=3|
| rowspan=3|
|-
| β−n
| 
|-
| β−2n ?
|  ?
|-
| rowspan=4|
| rowspan=4 style="text-align:right" | 11
| rowspan=4 style="text-align:right" | 19
| rowspan=4|
| rowspan=4|
| β−
| 
| rowspan=4|2+
| rowspan=4|
| rowspan=4|
|-
| β−n
| 
|-
| β−2n
| 
|-
| β−α
| 
|-
| rowspan=4|
| rowspan=4 style="text-align:right" | 11
| rowspan=4 style="text-align:right" | 20
| rowspan=4|
| rowspan=4|
| β− (> )
| 
| rowspan=4|3/2+
| rowspan=4|
| rowspan=4|
|-
| β−n
| 
|-
| β−2n
| 
|-
| β−3n (< )
| 
|-
| rowspan=3|
| rowspan=3 style="text-align:right" | 11
| rowspan=3 style="text-align:right" | 21
| rowspan=3|
| rowspan=3|
| β−
| 
| rowspan=3|(3−)
| rowspan=3|
| rowspan=3|
|-
| β−n
| 
|-
| β−2n
| 
|-
| rowspan=3|
| rowspan=3 style="text-align:right" | 11
| rowspan=3 style="text-align:right" | 22
| rowspan=3|
| rowspan=3|
| β−n
| 
| rowspan=3|(3/2+)
| rowspan=3|
| rowspan=3|
|-
| β−
| 
|-
| β−2n
| 
|-
| rowspan=3|
| rowspan=3 style="text-align:right" | 11
| rowspan=3 style="text-align:right" | 23
| rowspan=3|
| rowspan=3|
| β−2n (~)
| 
| rowspan=3|1+
| rowspan=3|
| rowspan=3|
|-
| β− (~)
| 
|-
| β−n (~)
| 
|-
| rowspan=3|
| rowspan=3 style="text-align:right" | 11
| rowspan=3 style="text-align:right" | 24
| rowspan=3|#
| rowspan=3|
| β−
| 
| rowspan=3|3/2+#
| rowspan=3|
| rowspan=3|
|-
| β−n ?
|  ?
|-
| β−2n ?
|  ?
|-
| rowspan=3|
| rowspan=3 style="text-align:right" | 11
| rowspan=3 style="text-align:right" | 26
| rowspan=3|#
| rowspan=3|1# ms [> ]
| β− ?
|  ?
| rowspan=3|3/2+#
| rowspan=3|
| rowspan=3|
|-
| β−n ?
|  ?
|-
| β−2n ?
|  ?
|-
| rowspan=3|
| rowspan=3 style="text-align:right" | 11
| rowspan=3 style="text-align:right" | 28
| rowspan=3|#
| rowspan=3|1# ms [> ]
| β− ?
|  ?
| rowspan=3|3/2+#
| rowspan=3|
| rowspan=3|
|-
| β−n ?
|  ?
|-
| β−2n ?
|  ?
|-

Sodium-22
It is also commonly used as a positron source in positron annihilation spectroscopy.

Sodium-24
Sodium-24 is radioactive and can be created from common sodium-23 by neutron activation.

Exposure of the human body to intense neutron radiation creates  in the blood plasma. Measurements of its quantity can be done to determine the absorbed radiation dose of a patient. This can be used to determine the type of medical treatment required.

When sodium is used as coolant in fast breeder reactors,  is created, which makes the coolant radioactive. When the  decays, it causes a buildup of magnesium in the coolant. Since the half-life is short, the  portion of the coolant ceases to be radioactive within a few days after removal from the reactor. Leakage of the hot sodium from the primary loop may cause radioactive fires, as it can ignite in contact with air (and explodes in contact with water). For this reason the primary cooling loop is within a containment vessel.

Notes

References

External links
Sodium isotopes data from The Berkeley Laboratory Isotopes Project's

 
Sodium
Sodium